Gaither is an extinct town in Lawrence County, in the U.S. state of Missouri.

A post office called Gaither was established in 1901, and remained in operation until 1907. The community was named after Ephraim Gaither, an early settler.

References

Ghost towns in Missouri
Former populated places in Lawrence County, Missouri